The Diocese of Helena is the Latin Church ecclesiastical territory or diocese of the Catholic Church in western Montana with its cathedral located in Helena. The diocese was created from the year-old Apostolic Vicariate of Montana on March 7, 1884, while Montana was still a territory. The Diocese of Helena is a suffragan diocese in ecclesiastical province of the Archdiocese of Portland in Oregon, a province that encompasses Oregon, Idaho, and Montana. 

The diocese covers 51,922 square miles of western and north central Montana, encompassing 21 counties and parts of two others. The diocese’s 57 parishes and 38 missions are structured into six deaneries: Bozeman, Butte, Conrad, Helena, Kalispell, and Missoula. Its diocesan church is the Cathedral of St. Helena, which was dedicated in 1914 and is located in Helena.

History

Before becoming a diocese, this was the Apostolic Vicariate of Montana (covering the whole territory and then the state of Montana). For its first twenty years, the diocese served all of Montana. In 1904 the new Diocese of Great Falls (later renamed the Diocese of Great Falls-Billings) was formed to serve eastern Montana.

The seat of the diocese is in the Cathedral of St. Helena in the state capital of Helena. It was completed in 1914.

Sexual abuse settlement and bankruptcy
On January 31, 2014, the Diocese of Helena filed for Chapter 11 bankruptcy protection as part of a $15 million settlement intended to go to 362 victims of sex abuse by clergy in the Diocese. The settlement, which was approved in 2015, covers Catholic churches in all or part of counties in western Montana.

Helena Synagogue Sale 
The Diocese of Helena closed the deal with the Montana Jewish Project, a nonprofit organization, on August 25, 2022 and sold the Temple Emanu-El, which was built in 1891. The organization fundraised for nine months to make the purchase and intend to use the synagogue as Jewish community center to host events and celebrations. The synagogue was in Diocese's possession since 1981, and it is the oldest synagogue in Montana. Bishop Austin Vetter and his staff negotiated the sale with the Montana Jewish Project for months.

Bishops

Apostolic Vicar of Montana
 Jean-Baptiste Brondel (1883–1884)  - Augustin Ravoux, S.J. (appointed in 1868), incapacitated, so did not assume office

Bishops of Helena
 Jean-Baptiste Brondel (1884–1903)
 John Patrick Carroll (1904–1925)
 George Joseph Finnigan (1927–1932)
 Ralph Leo Hayes (1933–1935), appointed Rector of the Pontifical North American College and Titular Bishop and later Bishop of Davenport
 Joseph Michael Gilmore (1935–1962)
 Raymond Gerhardt Hunthausen (1962–1975), appointed Archbishop of Seattle
 Elden Francis Curtiss (1976–1993), appointed Archbishop of Omaha
 Alexander Joseph Brunett (1994–1997), appointed Archbishop of Seattle
 Robert C. Morlino (1999–2003), appointed Bishop of Madison
 George Leo Thomas (2004–2018), appointed Bishop of Las Vegas
 Austin Anthony Vetter (2019–present)

Other priests of this diocese who became Bishops 
These bishops were priests in the diocese before consecration:

 Joseph Clement Willging, Bishop of the Roman Catholic Diocese of Pueblo
 Bernard Joseph Topel, Bishop of the Roman Catholic Diocese of Spokane
 Jeffrey M. Fleming, Coadjutor Bishop of the Roman Catholic Diocese of Great Falls–Billings

Diocesan College 

 Carroll College, Helena

High schools
Butte Central Catholic High School, Butte
Loyola Sacred Heart High School, Missoula

Elementary schools 
 De La Salle Blackfeet School, Browning
 Butte Central Elementary, Butte
 St Joseph Catholic School, Missoula
 St Matthew Elementary, Kalispell

See also

 Catholic Church by country
 Catholic Church in the United States
 Ecclesiastical Province of Portland in Oregon
 Global organisation of the Catholic Church
 List of Roman Catholic archdioceses (by country and continent)
 List of Roman Catholic dioceses (alphabetical) (including archdioceses)
 List of Roman Catholic dioceses (structured view) (including archdioceses)
 List of the Catholic dioceses of the United States

Notes

External links
Roman Catholic Diocese of Helena Official Site

 
Helena
Diocese of Helena
Helena
Helena
Helena
Companies that filed for Chapter 11 bankruptcy in 2014